The National Open University of Nigeria is a federal open and distance learning (ODL) institution, the first of its kind in the West African sub-region.
It is Nigeria's largest tertiary institution in terms of student number and is popularly referred to as 'NOUN'.

History

The university was initially established on 22 July 1983 as springboard for open and distance learning in Nigeria. It was suspended by the government on 25 April 1984. However, its resuscitation was begun on 12 April 2001 by the former President of Nigeria, Gen. Olusegun Obasanjo. At take off of the university, pioneer student enrollment stood at 32,400.

Organisation 

In 2011, NOUN had about 57,759 students. The Vice Chancellor at the time was Prof. Vincent Tenebe .
The university for years operated from its administrative headquarters in Victoria Island, Lagos, before vice chancellor Professor Abdalla Uba Adamu, moved it to its permanent headquarters in Jabi, Abuja, in 2016. The current Vice Chancellor is Prof. Olufemi Peters. It has over 75 study centres throughout the country.
It offers over 50 programmes and 750 courses.

By its nature as an ODL institution, NOUN does not provide lectures to students in normal classrooms except some certain study centres. The study centre in Lagos for instance provides lectures to all the law undergraduates and supplies course materials to all students after the payment of tuition fees. All courses offered by the university are accredited by the National Universities Commission (NUC).

The registrar serves as the secretary to council and senate bodies. The registry department's primary responsibility is to provide support services for the general administration of the university with emphasis on council affairs, senate matters, recruitment of staff, student admission and welfare, staff welfare and related activities. The current registrar is Mr. Oladapo Adetayo Ajayi

Students

Requirements

A diverse range of students from all walks of life are attracted to the university, similar to other Open Universities such as the Open University in the United Kingdom. For most courses there are no stringent entry requirements other than the ability to study at an appropriate level such as the West African Examination, and other national diplomas to qualify for direct entry admission. Most postgraduate courses require evidence of previous study  or equivalent life experience. This fundamental open admissions policy makes undergraduate university study accessible to all.

Undergraduates

While most of those studying are mature students, an increasingly large proportion of new undergraduates are aged between 17 and 25. The reduction in financial support for those attending traditional universities, coupled with the use of technologies such as and YouTube that appeal to this demographic, is believed to be behind this growth.

Immunity to strikes

The Act of Parliament which established the university prohibits any form of union for staff or for students. This has made the university unaffected by strikes such as the ASUU strikes (which lasted for eight months), which have the effect of extending the duration of students' studies.

National Youths Service Corps

The NOUN has made efforts to ensure its graduates below age 30 (the maximum age limit) participate in the National Youth Service Corps (NYSC).

Alumni 
Beverly Osu, actress, model and video vixen

Technological platforms

The iLearn portal provides students with access to the university's learning resources, including:
Online class discussions organized by NOUN facilitators, creating a virtual classroom environment.
Academic support for students
Social networking and collaboration tools to facilitate interactions among students, facilitators, academic staff and faculty members.
Study tools such as the digitized video and audio materials
Access to assignments, quizzes and self-study assessment tools

Examination

The university uses computer-based testing (CBT) for first and second year students, except for law undergraduates who sit conventional pen-on-paper (POP) from their first year of admission. POP examinations are used for all students after the second year, and for postgraduate students.

The CBT examinations have two formats: multiple choice questions and fill in the gap questions. The CBT system been criticised by some students, who say that the system requires students memorize their textbooks and produce answers that match those stored on the school's computers.

Assessment

Tutor-marked assignments (TMAs) are continuous assessments that accounts for 30% of a student's total score.  Students are expected to answer all TMAs, which must be answered and submitted before students sit for the end of course examination. The end of course examinations account for the other 70% of a student's score.

Facilities

E-library

The NOUN operates an e-library at the headquarters situated at Victoria Island, Lagos, Nigeria which all students have access to after providing a valid student's identity card. Students have access to both Internet facilities, books, journals, projects, theses of past students and other educational materials.

Radio station

The NOUN FM radio station broadcasts on workdays and provides opportunities for Mass Communication students.

E-courseware

The NOUN also provides a platform for students that needs to access its database of educational materials NOUN e-Courseware Free Download strictly for educational purposes rather than financial or commercial purposes. Books can be downloaded in PDF formats at no cost.

Scholarships

In May 2014, the Nollywood movie star Ini Edo made headlines when she was offered a scholarship to study law at the university. Other actresses and actors including Desmond Elliot have also been offered scholarships. Chioma Chukwuka-Akpotha, Francis Duru, Doris Simeon and Sani Danja were announced as ambassadors for the NOUN. All four were presented by the Vice Chancellor Prof. Vincent A. Tenebe, with scholarships to study their courses of choice.

References

External links

 
Distance education institutions based in Nigeria
Uyo
1983 establishments in Nigeria
Educational institutions established in 1983
Open universities
Federal universities of Nigeria